Vehicle registration plates are the mandatory number plates used to display the registration mark of a vehicle, and have existed in Russia for many decades. Most motor vehicles which are used on public roads are required by law to display them. Having a number plate obstructed by snow, mud, paper, or any other tool that makes any of the digits and letters illegible is considered an administrative offense and results in a fine.

History

Current plate format

The current format uses a letter followed by 3 digits and two more letters. To improve legibility of the numbers for Russian cars abroad, only a small subset of Cyrillic characters that look like Latin characters are used (12 letters: А, В, Е, К, М, Н, О, Р, С, Т, У, Х). Finally, the region number (77, 97, 99, 177, 197, 199, 777, 797 and 799 for Moscow; 78, 98, 178, and 198 for Saint Petersburg, etc.) and the international code RUS are included, as well as the national flag (the flag was not used on some of the earliest plates of this format (circa 1993 and 1994). There is a different format for trailers (2 letters and 4 digits). Motorcycles, mopeds and scooters plates are made of square reflective plates and its format is 4 digits at the top and two letters at the bottom. These plates lack a national flag.

The standard size for the license plate is 520 mm by 112 mm.

Vehicles used by certain organisations or categories of persons carry special plates:

Special plates in the above categories never carry the Russian flag, except for trailers. 

There are special series (usually numbers starting with A) reserved for government officials (for example, A 001 AA usually belongs to the governor of the region). The license plates for federal government officials originally had a larger flag instead of the regional code but this type has now been withdrawn as well.

Rich businessmen, prominent politicians and crime lords often use para-legally acquired special licence plates (government or police) to get preferential treatment from the transport police and as a status symbol. Often, this is used in conjunction with a flashing siren.  The Society of Blue Buckets is a protest movement that opposes this trend.

As of 2014, there are new codes for Russian plates; number 82 for the Republic of Crimea and 92 for Sevastopol. The Russian Federation annexed Crimea from Ukraine and now administers it as two federal subjects: the Republic of Crimea and the federal city of Sevastopol. Ukraine, backed by most of the international community, refuses to accept the annexation and continues to assert its right over the peninsula. Vehicles with such plates may have difficulty entering countries which recognize Crimea as Ukrainian territory and thus deem documents issued by the Russian Federation in Crimea to be invalid.

Runout problem
As per GOST provision, only 1,726,272 combinations may be issued within one administration unit (the digits 000 are not allowed). In certain regions, the number of vehicles exceeds that number, and the combination may not be reused after a vehicle was taken off the registration. All this creates an issue of running out of numbers.

A short-term solution was introducing more codes for those regions. Thus, some regions have two or three codes issued to them, the city of St. Petersburg has four, Moscow Oblast has six, and the federal city of Moscow has nine codes. But this does not fully solve the problem, as the authorities may eventually run out of three-numeral regional codes, and a fourth digit will not fit without changing the standardised layout of the plate. Since October 2013, when a vehicle is registered to a new owner, the registration plate could remain on the vehicle and a new registration number is not required, even if the vehicle is registered in another region.

The problem was resolved by re-registering plates that are no longer in use. Also, since 2013, the owner can keep the license plate for themself personally, or leave it on the car when selling it to another person.

Regional codes

The license plate regional codes from 01 to 89 originally matched the numerical order of the federal subjects of Russia as listed in the Article 65 of the Constitution of Russia at the moment of the creation of the standard.  In the following years some codes were reassigned or discontinued (for example code number 20 for the Chechen Republic: to prevent illegal registrations, and due to the destruction of the database in the 1990s, all the vehicles of Chechnya were reregistered).  As the populous regions started running out of license plate combinations, new codes past code 89 were assigned to them as well.  Additional triple-digit codes were created by adding a "1", "7", or "9" to the existing regional code (e.g. 54 and 154 for Novosibirsk Oblast, or 16, 116 and 716 in Tatarstan, or 977 in Moscow following the runout of 1XX and 7XX codes). Those regions with an asterisk (*) beside them were involved in mergers with other regions, so are no longer issued, and have their codes listed with an asterisk with the region they are now a part of.

In June 2014, code 82 (formerly registered to the Koryak Autonomous District) was put back into registration for the Republic of Crimea, while Sevastopol adopted the new code 92. The reason for the decision to use code 82 was because, between the beginning of this plate format and the merging of the district, Koryak AO only registered 1,548 civilian car license plates (starting at A001AA/82 and ending at B549AA/82) and far less of other types (some types, such as public transport plates, were never issued in the region).

Codes of diplomatic representative offices and international organizations

According to the Ministry of Internal Affairs Order 282 from March 28, 2002.

Notes

See also
Vehicle registration plate
Vehicle registration plates of Bulgaria, which uses similar letters and numbers
European vehicle registration plates

References

Russia
Russia transport-related lists
Road transport in Russia
Registration plates